Hira Singh Khatri is the director of the first Nepali movie, Aama. After the success of the first movie, he directed two more movies for the Nepal government.

Filmography

References

External links
 

Year of birth missing (living people)
Place of birth missing (living people)
Nepalese film directors
Possibly living people
20th-century Nepalese screenwriters
20th-century Nepalese film directors